Metacrisia is a genus of moths in the family Erebidae. The genus was erected by George Hampson in 1901.

Species
Metacrisia courregesi (Dognin, 1891)
Metacrisia schausi Dognin, 1911
Metacrisia woolfsonae Toulgoët, 1988

References

External links

Phaegopterina
Moth genera